"Off the Record" is a single from Louisville, Kentucky indie rock band My Morning Jacket released in October, 2005 by ATO Records.

Music video
The music video for "Off the Record" features a school boy telling something to a young girl, who then passes the saying to another person; it eventually spreads to an office building. The people are soon arrested by the police for telling the saying.

Track listing
Compact disc
"Off the Record" (single edit) – 3:24
"How Could I Know" – 5:27
"Chills" – 4:40
"Off the Record" – 5:33

7" vinyl
"Off the Record" – 5:33
"How Could I Know" – 5:27

Personnel
Carl Broemel – guitar
Patrick Hallahan – drums
Jim James – vocals, lead and rhythm guitars
Bo Koster – keyboards
"Two-Tone" Tommy – bass guitar

Media
The song "Chills" appears on the soundtrack of the television series Heroes. "Off the Record" is played at the end of the How I Met Your Mother episode "Game Night".

Cover version
"Off the Record" was covered by Swedish performer Moneybrother on his 2006 album Pengabrorsan. The cover version is titled "Under Bordet", has a faster tempo, and is sung in Swedish.

References

External links
"Off the Record" information from the official My Morning Jacket web site
Recording Studios

2005 singles
My Morning Jacket songs
Reggae songs
Song recordings produced by John Leckie
2005 songs
ATO Records singles
Songs written by Tom Blankenship
Songs written by Jim James